Odukpani is a Local Government Area in Cross River State, Nigeria. It lies between latitude 5°4'52.46''N and longitude 8°20'59.7''E and has an elevation approximately 413 ft. It is largely populated by the Efik people.

President Olusegun Obasanjo announced in March 2006 that a 561 megawatt gas turbine power station was to be opened at Ikot Nyong in the LGA.
In April 2008 the House Committee on Power and Steel was investigating the power station project, which was only 30% complete and eight months behind schedule, although the contractor had been fully paid.

Settlements in Odukpani include Akpap Okoyong, Eki, Eniong Abatim, Ito, Idere, Ukwa Ibom, Creek Town, Inuakpa Okoyong, Okurikang. The LGA has approximately a population of 257,800 persons.

The paramount ruler of Odukpani local government area is His Royal Majesty, Etinyin Otu Asuquo Otu Mesembe VI

Climate
The climate of Odukpani is tropical humid with wet and dry seasons annual rainfall between 1300-3000mm.These areas are characterized by high temperature, rainfall and humidity.

References

Inuakpa Okoyong

Local Government Areas in Cross River State